Ian Stuart Whyte (born 17 September 1971) is a Welsh actor, stuntman and former professional basketball player. He is best known for his roles as Predators in the Alien vs. Predator film series, Sheikh Suleiman in the 2010 remake of Clash of the Titans, The Last Engineer in Prometheus, as well as various characters in the HBO fantasy series Game of Thrones.

Career
Whyte began his career a professional basketball player for the Newcastle Eagles. He also collected 80 caps for the England national team. After his retirement from basketball he began his second career as a stuntman and actor.

Whyte is best known for portraying Predators in the movies Alien vs. Predator and Aliens vs. Predator: Requiem.

In 2010, Whyte played Sheikh Sulieman in Clash of the Titans.

Whyte portrayed one of the "Engineer" aliens seen in Ridley Scott's 2012 science fiction film, Prometheus.

He has portrayed various characters requiring a physically tall actor in the HBO series Game of Thrones, including White Walkers in season 1 and season 2 and a giant in the opening episode of season 3. For these roles he was unrecognisable under make-up and computer effects. In season 2, he also had a speaking role as Gregor Clegane. In season 5 and season 6, Whyte portrayed the giant Wun Wun. He later played a giant wight in episode 3 of Season 8.

Personal life 
Whyte was born in Bangor, Gwynedd, Wales. Whyte is married to Amy, a business development manager for the Gordon Brown Law Firm. They have one son.

Filmography

See also 
 List of tallest people

References

External links 
 

1971 births
Living people
People from Bangor, Gwynedd
Welsh male film actors
21st-century Welsh male actors
Welsh male television actors
Welsh men's basketball players